The 2022–23 Coupe de France preliminary rounds, Occitanie is the qualifying competition to decide which teams from the leagues of the Occitanie region of France take part in the main competition from the seventh round.

A total of ten teams will qualify from the Occitanie preliminary rounds.

In 2021–22, seventh-tier Montauban FCTG progressed furthest in the competition, reaching the round of 64 as one of the joint-lowest ranked teams at that stage, before losing to fifth-tier La Roche VF in stoppage time.

Draws and fixtures
The league published the first round draw on 19 July 2022, showing that a total of 496 teams had entered from the region, with 124 teams exempt beyond the first round. As in previous seasons, the draw for this round was made within individual districts of the league. The draw for the second round was published on 26 July 2022, with ties again drawn within individual districts of the league. The 106 teams from Régional 1 and below which were exempted from the first round, entered at this stage.

The third round draw was published on 31 August 2022, having been made a day earlier. The eleven teams from Championnat National 3 joined the competition at this stage. The fourth round draw was published on 14 September 2022, which saw the entry of the three teams from Championnat National 2.

The fifth round draw was published on 27 September 2022, and published a day later. The sixth round draw was published on 11 October 2022.

First round
These matches are from the Ariège district, and were played on 18 and 20 August 2022.

These matches are from the Aude district, and were played on 19 and 20 August 2022.

These matches are from the Aveyron and Lozère districts, and were played on 18, 19, and 20 August 2022.

These matches are from the Gard district, and were played on 19 and 20 August 2022.

These matches are from the Haute-Garonne district, and were played on 18, 19 and 20 August 2022.

These matches are from the Gers district, and were played on 17, 18, 19 and 20 August 2022.

These matches are from the Hérault district, and were played on 19 and 20 August 2022.

These matches are from the Lot district, and were played on 18, 19, 20 and 21 August 2022.

These matches are from the Hautes-Pyrénées district, and were played on 18, 19 and 20 August 2022.

These matches are from the Pyrénées-Orientales district, and were played on 20 August 2022.

These matches are from the Tarn district, and were played on 18, 19 and 20 August 2022.

These matches are from the Tarn-et-Garonne district, and were played on 18, 19 and 20 August 2022.

Second round
These matches are from the Ariège district, and were played on 26, 27 and 28 August 2022.

These matches are from the Aude district, and were played on 28 August 2022.

These matches are from the Aveyron and Lozère districts, and were played on 26, 27 and 28 August 2022.

These matches are from the Gard district, and were played on 27 and 28 August 2022.

These matches are from the Haute-Garonne district, and were played on 26, 27 and 28 August 2022.

These matches are from the Gers district, and were played on 26, 27 and 28 August 2022.

These matches are from the Hérault district, and were played on 27 and 28 August 2022.

These matches are from the Lot district, and were played on 28 August 2022.

These matches are from the Hautes-Pyrénées district, and were played on 27 and 28 August 2022.

These matches are from the Pyrénées-Orientales district, and were played on 28 August 2022.

These matches are from the Tarn district, and were played on 26, 27 and 28 August 2022.

These matches are from the Tarn-et-Garonne district, and were played on 26, 27 and 28 August 2022.

Third round
These matches were played on 10 and 11 September 2022.

Fourth round
These matches were played on 24 and 25 September 2022.

Fifth round
These matches were played on 8 and 9 October 2022.

These matches were played on 15 and 16 October 2022.

References

Preliminary rounds